Various publications and commentators have offered a range of predictions of the end of Wikipedia. As soon as Wikipedia became well-known—around 2005—one scenario of decline after another has appeared, based on various assumptions and allegations. For example, some claim a degradation in quality of Wikipedia's articles, while others say potential editors are turning away. Others suggest that disagreements within the Wikipedia community will lead to the collapse of Wikipedia as a project.

Some predictions present a criticism of Wikipedia as a fatal flaw, and some go on to predict that a rival website will do what Wikipedia does, but without that fatal flaw. This would make it a Wikipedia-killer, capturing the attention and resources which Wikipedia currently gets. Many online encyclopedias exist; proposed replacements for Wikipedia have included Google's since-closed Knol, WolframAlpha, and AOL's since-closed Owl.

However, contrary to these predictions, Wikipedia has been constantly growing in both size and influence.

Factors 
Some critics cite specific hoaxes, errors, propaganda and other poor content, and assert that the lack of good content will lead to people finding better content elsewhere.

Wikipedia is crowdsourced by a few million volunteer editors. Tens of thousands contribute the majority of contents, and several thousand do quality control and maintenance work. As the encyclopedia expanded in the 2010s, the number of active editors did not steadily grow and sometimes declined. Various sources have predicted that Wikipedia will eventually have too few editors to be functional and collapse from lack of participation.

Wikipedia has  volunteer administrators who perform various functions, including functions similar to those carried out by a forum moderator. Critics have described their actions as harsh, bureaucratic, biased, unfair, or capricious, and predicted that the resulting outrage will lead to the site's closure. Some such critics are aware of the duties of administrators; others merely assume they govern the site.

Various 2012 articles reported that a decline in English Wikipedia's recruitment of new administrators could end Wikipedia.

Others suggest that the unwarranted deletion of useful articles from Wikipedia may portend its end.  That brought about the creation of Deletionpedia, which itself ceased to exist in 2008 and was relaunched in 2013.

Decline in editors

A 2014 trend analysis published in The Economist stated that "The number of editors for the English-language version has fallen by a third in seven years." The attrition rate for active editors in English Wikipedia was described by The Economist as substantially higher than in other languages (non-English Wikipedias). It reported that in other languages, the number of "active editors" (those with at least five edits per month) has been relatively constant since 2008: some 42,000 editors, with narrow seasonal variances of about 2,000 editors up or down.

In the English Wikipedia, the number of active editors peaked in 2007 at about 50,000 editors, and fell to 30,000 editors in 2014. A linear decline at this rate would leave no active editors of English Wikipedia by 2025.

Given that the trend analysis published in The Economist presented the number of active editors for Wikipedia in other languages (non-English Wikipedia) as remaining relatively constant, sustaining their numbers at approximately 42,000 active editors, the contrast pointed to the effectiveness of Wikipedia in those languages to retain their active editors on a renewable and sustained basis.  Though different language versions of Wikipedia have different policies, no comment identified a particular policy difference as potentially making a difference in the rate of editor attrition for English Wikipedia. Editor count showed a slight uptick a year later, and no clear trend after that.

In a 2013 article, Tom Simonite of MIT Technology Review said that for several years running the number of Wikipedia editors had been falling and cited the bureaucratic structure and rules as a factor.  Simonite alleged that some Wikipedians use the labyrinthine rules and guidelines to dominate others and have a vested interest in keeping the status quo.  A January 2016 article in Time by Chris Wilson said Wikipedia might lose many editors because a collaboration of occasional editors and smart software will take the lead.

Andrew Lih and Andrew Brown both maintain editing Wikipedia with smartphones is difficult and discourages new potential contributors. Lih alleges there is serious disagreement among existing contributors how to resolve this. Lih fears for Wikipedia's long-term future while Brown fears problems with Wikipedia will remain and rival encyclopedias will not replace it.

Sources of viewers and funds
As of 2015, there had been a marked decline in persons who viewed Wikipedia from their computers, and according to The Washington Post "on their phones...[people are] far less likely to donate". At the time, the Wikimedia Foundation reported reserves equivalent to one year's budgeted expenditures. On the other hand, the number of paid staff had ballooned, so those expenses increased.

In 2021, Andreas Kolbe, a former co-editor-in-chief of The Signpost, wrote Wikimedia Foundation was reaching its 10-year goal of a $100 million endowment, five years earlier than planned, which may surprise donors and users around the world who regularly see Wikipedia fundraising banners. He also said accounting methods disguise the size of operating surpluses, top managers earn $300,000 – $400,000 a year, and over 40 people work exclusively on fundraising.

Timeline of predictions
In the fall of 2020, on the eve of the 20th anniversary of Wikipedia, associate professor of the Department of Communication Studies at Northeastern University Joseph Reagle conducted a retrospective study of numerous "predictions of the ends of Wikipedia" that took place in these 20 years.

He divided the waves of predictions into periods: "Early growth (2001–2002)", "Nascent identity (2001–2005)", "Production model (2005–2010)", "Contributor attrition (2009–2017)" and the current period "(2020–)".  Each of these periods brought its own distinctive fatal predictions, which never came true.  As a result, Joseph Reagle is firmly convinced that Wikipedia is not in danger.

See also 
 Good Faith Collaboration: The Culture of Wikipedia
 Wikipedia Zero

References

Further reading
 
 
 WP:THREATENING2MEN 
 
 
 

Criticism of Wikipedia
Mass media disestablishments
Prediction